Ladislau Ludovic Bonyhádi (born 25 March 1923 - deceased 13 June 1997 in Miami, Florida, United States) was a Romanian football player of Hungarian ethnicity. He was one of the legends of UTA Arad, being the top-goalscorer of Liga I twice, in 1947 and 1948. In the 1947–48 season, he scored 49 goals, which is still a record for Romanian first league, despite that Dudu Georgescu scored 47 goals in the 1976 -1977 season whom was regarded as European record, until Messi scored 50 goals in the 2011–2012 season. He earned also three caps for the Romania national side. After his last season at ITA Arad, he went to Hungary, and played for a few teams in a lower league. In 1958, he became coach at the class teams from the neighboring country.

Honours

Club 
UTA Arad
Liga I (2): 1946–47, 1947–48
Romanian Cup (1): 1947–48

Individual 
 Liga I top scorer (2): 1946–47, 1947–48

Trivia 
 Although born in Hungary, he played for the Romania national team.
 He played only 54 matches for UTA Arad, but he scored a huge number of 80 goals, being ranked second in the all-time classification of top-goalscorers from UTA Arad.
 In a ranking of most goals scored in a championship edition, compiled by the RSSSF, this record of Bonyhádi placed him on 20th, on par with that of Pelé, in the 1965 season of the Campeonato Paulista, and Uwe Seeler, in the Bundesliga season 1959–60.

External links 

1923 births
1997 deaths
People from Bonyhád
Hungarian footballers
Romanian footballers
Romania international footballers
FC UTA Arad players
Szegedi AK players
Romanian sportspeople of Hungarian descent
Liga I players
Romanian expatriate footballers
Expatriate footballers in Hungary
Romanian expatriate sportspeople in Hungary
Association football forwards
Sportspeople from Tolna County